Thyenula armata is a jumping spider species in the genus Thyenula that lives in South Africa and Lesotho. It was first described by Wanda Wesołowska in 2001.

References

Salticidae
Spiders described in 2001
Spiders of Africa
Spiders of South Africa
Fauna of Lesotho